The 1936–37 Cornell Big Red men's ice hockey season was the 30th season of play for the program. The teams was coached by Nick Bawlf in his 15th season.

Season
The Cornell season got under way earlier than normal as the Big Red had scheduled two games in late-December at the Playland Casino Rink. The team split its two-game set in Rye and the defense performed well in both games.

Unfortunately for Cornell, Beebe Lake was completely unusable after Christmas and the team wasn't able to get in any practice time, let along play a game until their first scheduled road game in late-January. Coach Bawlf thought better of sending his unprepared team up against the powerful Clarkson team and the game was cancelled. The two games in December ended up being the only matches played all year as the weather continued to be trouble for the Big Red.

Roster

Standings

Schedule and results

|-
!colspan=12 style=";" | Regular Season

References

Cornell Big Red men's ice hockey seasons
Cornell
Cornell
Cornell
Cornell